is a major commercial, business, shopping and entertainment district in Kita-ku, Osaka, Japan, and the city's main northern railway terminus (Ōsaka Station, Umeda Station). The district's name means "plum field".

History 
Umeda was historically called Umeda Haka (Umeda Grave), because it was 1 of 7 largest cemeteries of Osaka from the Edo period (1603-1868) till the initial 20 years of the Meiji period (1868-1912). In 2020, survey teams for the Umekita redevelopment project discovered ancient burial remains of over 1,500 people. Experts say these remains were of commoners, not the aristocracy. They used several burial styles, both cremated as well as buried with enclosed wooden caskets, barrel-shaped open containers and earthenware coffins called kameganbo (turtle caskets). They found burial items such as pipes, clay dolls, rokusenmon (a set of six coins to pay passage across the Sanzu River which separates the world of the living and the afterlife) and juzudama (rosary-style prayer beads). A stone wall separated a mass grave with skeletons that were only covered by soil. These are thought to be the deceased of a plague.

Until the 1870s, the area which is now Umeda was agricultural land. The area was reclaimed and filled in by the prefectural government in the 1870s to support the creation of the first Osaka Station. The word "Umeda" was previously written with different kanji characters; 埋田 (English: "buried field") to reflect this history. The name was changed to 梅田 (English: "plum field") without altering the pronunciation, likely due to negative connotations with the previous characters.

The original Osaka Station, a two-story red brick building, was opened in 1874, along with the first railway connecting Osaka and Kobe cities, and in 1876 an additional line to Kyoto. This was essentially the establishment of Umeda as a district. As industry in the area increased at the turn of the century, the station required expansion, so in 1901 the first station was demolished, and a larger station was built in the location where Osaka Station resides in a different form today. Hanshin Umeda station was constructed in 1906, followed by Hankyu Umeda Station in 1910, the Umeda subway station and Midosuji subway line in 1933 and Kitashinchi station in 1997. The current incarnation of Osaka Station was built in 1979, but underwent extensive renovation and reconstruction between 2005 and 2011, including the addition of the North Gate Building, a glass roof covering the tracks, and vast additional retail space providing shops, restaurants, sports centers and movie theatres to the area. For the 2011 re-opening, the station was re-branded Osaka Station City.

The construction of Umeda Sky Building in 1993 and the re-branding of Osaka Station City in 2011 have transformed the Umeda area from a business district to a retail and tourist attraction.

Politics and Government 
Umeda makes up a large part of the Kita Ward of Osaka city, the Kita Ward Electorate could elect three representatives to the current composition of the Osaka Municipal Assembly. As of 2018, the Kita electoral district was represented by Takayama Mia from the Osaka Restoration Association, Maeda Kazuhiko from the Liberal Democratic Party and Yamamoto Tomoko from Komeito.

Before the 2019 Japanese unified local elections in April 2019, the number of representatives from Kita was increased to four. The 2019 election results saw all three incumbent representatives re-elected, along with Osaka Restoration Association newcomer Kuramoto Takayuki.

Geography 

Umeda officially only covers JR West Osaka Station and the immediate area to its south and west, although "Umeda" is often used to describe much of the surrounding area, and is commonly used as a catch-all to refer to the downtown area of northern Osaka City.

In addition to JR Osaka Station, Kitashinchi Station, Hankyu Umeda Station and Hanshin Umeda Station are located in this area. Osaka Metro's Higashi-Umeda Station and Nishi-Umeda Station provide subway services to and from Umeda, making it a key transportation hub for the greater Osaka area. Underneath the main roads is an underground city which connects most of the local train stations and provides retailers, eateries and access to the area's department stores and the Dojima area of Kita ward.

Official districts of Umeda: 
Umeda 1-chome: Diamond District, Hanshin Department Store, Hilton Hotels & Resorts Osaka.
Umeda 2-chome: Osaka Garden City, Herbis Osaka 
Umeda 3-chome: Osaka Station, Osaka Garden City, Nishi Umeda Square

The area commonly referred to as Umeda, though outside of Umeda-proper, includes:

Shibata
Chayamachi
Tsuruno
Toyosaki 2-chome
Kakuda
Nakazaki 2-chome, 4-chome
Komatsubara
Doyama
Banzai
Taiyuji
Togano
Sonezaki
Sonezaki Shinchi
Dojima
Dojimahama
Nishitenma
Oyodo-Naka 1-chome
Oyodo-Minami 1-chome
Ofukacho
Nakatsu 1-chome, 5-chome

These areas are not officially part of the Umeda district, but may use "Umeda" on their buildings, business names, and in their advertising, and are commonly referred to unofficially as the Umeda area. An example of this is the Umeda Sky Building, one of Osaka's most recognizable landmarks, which resides not in Umeda but in Oyodo-Naka.

Districts

Osaka Station City
Osaka Station City refers to the immediate area around Osaka Station, above and below ground. JR Osaka Station boasts the largest number of passengers in and out of any station in the JR West network, so Osaka Station City is the central hub of Umeda.

South Gate Building 
Daimaru Umeda
Hotel Granvia Osaka 
North Gate Building 
Luqua
Luqua 1100 
Osaka Station Cinema 
Osaka Station JR Express Bus Terminal

Diamond District 

Umeda 1-chome

Diamond District refers to the area of Umeda 1-chome north of Hanshin Umeda Station and south of Osaka Station. A pentagonal section of Umeda 1-chome surrounded by the Midosuji and Sonezaki Dori roads, which resembles a diamond on the map. The price of land within this area is among the highest in Osaka, so it has come to be known as the "Diamond District". The area contains some of the largest skyscrapers in Osaka, department stores and recognizable buildings. The Osaka Maru Building has become a symbol of Umeda, due to its early construction and unique cylindrical shape.

Osaka Umeda Twin Towers South
Hanshin Department Store
Hilton Plaza Osaka
Osaka Maru Building
Osaka Station 1st Building
Osaka Station 2nd Building
Osaka Station 3rd Building
Osaka Station 4th Building

Nishi-Umeda 
Umeda 2-chome / Umeda 3-chome / Osaka Garden City

Nishi-Umeda refers to the area of Osaka Garden City in Umeda 2-chome and 3-chome. The Nishi-Umeda district is the main business center of the Umeda area. Nishi-Umeda hosts the facilities of the Ritz Carlton Osaka, Mainichi Shimbun main office and many corporate headquarters for western Japan, it is easily accessible underground via Hanshin Umeda Station and serviced by the Osaka Metro subway system. The comparatively high concentration of tall buildings in Nishi-Umeda (and neighboring Dojima and Nakanoshima) form a prominent skyscraper district.

Nishi-Umeda Square (event space, former location of Osaka Central Post Office) 
Herbis Osaka 
The Ritz-Carlton Osaka 
TBS Kansai Branch Office 
Hankyu Corporation Head Office 
Herbis ENT 
Osaka Shiki Theater 
Mitsubishi Corporation Kansai Branch Office 
Hilton Hotels & Resorts Plaza Osaka (Hilton Plaza West) 
Mainichi Shimbun Building 

Daiwa House Osaka Building 
Osaka Central Hospital 
Hotel Monterey Osaka 
Hearton Hotel Nishi Umeda 
Breeze Tower 
Nippon Ham Head Office 
Bayer Japan Corporate Headquarters 
All Nippon Airways Osaka Branch 
Fuji TV Kansai Branch Office 
Yahoo! Osaka Branch Office

Hankyu Umeda/Kita-Umeda 

Shibata 1-chome, Kakuda, Chayamachi, Tsuruno, Nishi-Nakazaki 2-chome

The Hankyu Umeda/Kita-Umeda district is the area of Umeda immediately surrounding Hankyu Umeda Station, the largest terminal of the Hankyu Corporation. The area extending to the east and north of the station hosts many buildings owned or funded by the Hankyu Corporation, so it is colloquially referred to as Hankyu-mura (lit:Hankyu village). Buildings such as the HEP Five building and Ferris wheel, Hankyu Mens department store, TOHO Cinemas, the Hankyu Grand Building, Hankyu Sanbangai shopping street, a string of antique book and art sellers, and the main branch of Hankyu Department Store, a 187 meter, 41-story building.

The west side of Hankyu station hosts hotels, restaurants, fitness clubs, and the Hankyu Corporation's headquarters. The area to the northeast of the station has been rapidly developing since the 1990s. The Chayamachi area, in particular, is growing quickly since the construction of NU Chayamachi shopping mall.

Hankyu Umeda Station 
Hankyu Sanbangai 
Kinokuniya Bookstore Umeda Main Store 
Umeda Hankyu Building 
Hankyu Department Store Umeda Main Store 
Toshiba Kansai Branch Office 
Hankyu Terminal Building 
Hankyu Grand Building 
Osaka New Hankyu Hotel

HEP NAVIO 
Hankyu Men's Osaka 
TOHO Cinemas Umeda 
HEP Five 
Yanmar Flying Y Building 
UNIQLO Osaka 
NU Chayamachi 
Hankyu Corporation Head Office 
Maruzen/Junkudo book store

Osaka Station North 

Ofukacho, Shibata 2-chome

The area to the north of JR Osaka Station. This area hosts the Seiseikai Nakatsu Hospital, JR West Japan Headquarters, and JR Umeda Freight Station. Since large-scale redevelopment is being undertaken in the area, land prices have been rising, and now Obukacho 4-chome has become the site with the highest land prices in West Japan. The area's rise has been attributed to the opening of the large Yodobashi Camera electronics department store in 2001, and since then other large developments such as Grand Front Osaka and a satellite campus of Osaka University have been completed. It is commonly called "Umekita".

Grand Front Osaka 
Kirin Osaka Branch 
Mitsubishi Electric Kansai Branch Office 
Fuji Electric Kansai Branch Office 
Square Enix Osaka Office 
Intercontinental Hotel Osaka 
Yodobashi Camera Umeda
JR West Headquarters 
Seiseikai Nakatsu Hospital

Higashi-Umeda 
Komatsubara, Hoyama, Sonezaki, Taiyuji, Togano, Doyama-cho

Located to the east of JR Osaka Station, it is a less-developed area of Umeda, with fewer skyscrapers, and generally far smaller buildings. Higashi-Umeda is known for its low-cost retailers in the covered Hankyu Higashidori and Sonezaki Ohatsutenjin shopping streets. The area boasts a bustling nightlife, with Japanese izakaya bars, restaurants, arcades, sex shops, love hotels and pachinko parlors. The area hosts the Tsuyu-no-Tenjinsha shinto shrine. Doyama-cho is one of Japan's few LGBT districts, and known to be the home to one of the largest homosexual communities in west Japan.

NAMCO Umeda Store 
TOHO Cinemas 
Don Quijote Umeda Main Store 
Round One Game Center 
Hankyu Higashidori Shopping Street 
Sonezaki Ohatsutenjin Shopping Street 
Tsuyu-no-Tenjinsha Shrine

Kitashinchi 
Kitashinchi was a high-class entertainment district of Osaka until the end of the bubble era, at which point its reputation decreased. It has been known as a red light district since the Edo period. The area hosts restaurants, karaoke, hostess clubs, snack bars, brothels, and pole dance bars. The area is famous for its kushikatsu restaurants.

Tōru Hashimoto, former Mayor of Osaka and Governor of Osaka Prefecture, while working as a lawyer in the Tobitashinchi red light district in the south of Osaka, was revealed to have had an affair with hostesses in Kitashinchi before entering politics, a scandal that led to heavy criticism during political campaigns, along with allegations of ties to yakuza.

Underground City 
The Osaka Underground City was completed in 1942 as a station underpass but has been dramatically expanded since. The total underground area extends from Chayamachi in the north to Dojima in the south, and Doyamacho in the east to Osaka Garden City in the west. The area connects the shopping malls of Whity Umeda and Diamor Osaka with the basements of Hankyu Sanbangai, Hankyu Department Store, Hanshin Department Store, JR Osaka Station, Osaka Ekimae Building, Osaka Toukoku Life Building, New Hankyu Building, and Herbis Osaka. More expansions to the underground city are planned to be completed by the end of 2022.
Whity Umeda
Diamor Osaka
Dojima Underground Center

University Campuses

Many university satellite campuses and research centers opened in Umeda in the 2010s due to the convenience of public transport and proximity to the business district.

 Osaka University Umeda Satellite/Cultural Exchange Center
 Osaka Institute of Technology Umeda Campus
 Osaka Sangyo University Umeda Satellite Campus
 Kansai University Umeda Campus
 Kwansei Gakuin University Osaka Umeda Campus
 Kyoto University of Art & Design Osaka Satellite Campus
 Keio University Keio Osaka City Campus

 Kobe University Umeda Intelligent Laboratory
 Sophia University Osaka Satellite Campus
 Takarazuka University Osaka Umeda Campus
 Doshisha University Osaka Satellite Campus
 Nagoya University of Commerce & Business Osaka Umekita Campus
 Ritsumeikan University Osaka Umeda Campus
 Ryukoku University Osaka Umeda Campus

Transportation

Rail 
 JR West
 Osaka Station: Tokaido Main Line (JR Kyoto Line, JR Kobe Line), Fukuchiyama Line (JR Takarazuka Line), Osaka Loop Line 
Kitashinchi Station: JR Tozai Line
Hankyu Railway
Umeda Station: Kobe Main Line, Takarazuka Main Line, Kyoto Main Line
Hanshin Electric Railway
Umeda Station: Hanshin Main Line
Osaka Metro
Umeda Station: Midosuji Line
Higashi-Umeda Station: Tanimachi Line
Nishi-Umeda Station: Yotsubashi Line

Roads and Highways 

 Hanshin Expressway Route 11 Ikeda Line
Midosuji

See also
Namba
Tourism in Japan

References

External links

 Osaka InfoGuide

 
Tourist attractions in Osaka Prefecture
Shopping districts and streets in Japan
Central business districts